Wilhelm Johann Harald Hoegner (23 September 1887 in Munich – 5 March 1980 in Munich) was the second Bavarian prime minister (SPD) after World War II (1945–1946 and 1954–1957), and the father of the Bavarian constitution. He has been the only Social Democrat to hold this office since 1920.

Early life 
Wilhelm Hoegner was born in Munich in 1887, the son of Michael Georg Hoegner and Therese Engelhardt. Growing up in Burghausen, he studied law in Munich, Berlin and Erlangen. After graduation, he worked as a lawyer, then as a Staatsanwalt, a state prosecutor. In 1919 he became a member of the SPD. He married Anna Woock in 1918, with whom he had two children.

Interwar politics and exile 
From 1924 to 1930, Hoegner was a Social Democratic member of the Landtag of Bavaria. He was involved in the investigation into Hitler's Beer Hall Putsch in 1923 and through this became part of the opposition to the Nazis. He published, anonymously, a paper on the findings of the investigation, which is considered an important historical document due to the fact that the Nazis destroyed all official reports from the inquest after 1933. He actively opposed Hitler in his time as a member of the German Reichstag from 1930 to 1933. For this reason, he was dismissed from government service after the Nazi takeover in 1933 and had to escape to Austria, and from there, in 1934, to Switzerland, where he worked as a freelance writer. He was in contact there with other German refugees from the Nazis and worked with them in an organisation called Demokratisches Deutschland, aimed against the Nazis.

Postwar politics 
Upon his return to Bavaria in June 1945, he served at the court in Munich. He became prime minister of Bavaria from 1945 to 1946, after the sudden dismissal of Fritz Schäffer, also holding the post of Minister of Justice until 1947. He became known at this time as the father of the new Bavarian constitution. After losing the December 1946 election, he was replaced as Bavarian prime minister by Hans Ehard but remained as Minister of Justice. When his party decided to leave the coalition with the Christian Social Union (CSU), he opposed this move and temporarily lost influence within the SPD, resigning from his ministerial post.

From 1946 to 1970, he was again a member of the Bavarian Landtag (parliament), leading the SPD faction there from 1958 to 1962. He held the post of Minister of the Interior from 1950 to 1954, when Bavaria was ruled by a CSU-SPD coalition. During this time, he devoted a great deal of effort towards the reunification of the Palatinate with the rest of Bavaria, but ultimately failed, as only 7.6 percent of all eligible voters in the Palatinate voted for reunification.

He became prime minister of Bavaria for a second time in 1954, when he led a four-party grand coalition government until 1957. The coalition fell apart before the end of its term after the 1957 federal elections and, as of 2018, Wilhelm Hoegner is still the last non-CSU prime minister of Bavaria.

He was also a member of the German Bundestag from 1961 to 1962.

While a social democrat, Hoegner was not a doctrinaire socialist, and he always preferred a common-sense approach to politics and the economy, rather than radical theories. He considered being a social democrat to be wholly compatible with Christian ethics and values—an important factor in the traditionally conservative and Catholic-dominated state of Bavaria.

Hoegner died, aged 92, almost blind but mentally still in full capacity, on 5 March 1980 in Munich.

"The Guilt of the Communists" 
Hoegner's book Die verratene Republik (The Betrayed Republic), published in Munich in 1979, contains a remarkable chapter with the title "The Guilt of the Communists". Hoegner blames the Communist Party of Germany (KPD) as having played a decisive role in Hitler's assumption of power. The declared main enemy of the Communists was not Hitler or the conservative parties in Germany, but the SPD, the social democrats, whom the Communists called the "social fascists". Hoegner claims that the Communists' intention was to bring Hitler to power whereupon a Communist revolution in Germany would take place and a Communist dictatorship would be established. Hoegner mentions astonishing claims in this chapter; for example, that 500,000 communists had voted for Hitler in the election for president of the German Reich in 1932.

Honours
 Grand Cross of the Order of Merit of the Federal Republic of Germany (1953)
 Knight Grand Cross of the Order of Merit of the Italian Republic (1956)
 Grand Decoration of Honour in Silver with Sash for Services to the Republic of Austria (1957)
 Honorary doctorate at the University of Munich

Works
 Die verratene Republik (in German), by Wilhelm Hoegner, Munich, 1979.
 Der Volksbetrug der Nationalsozialisten (in German), by Wilhelm Hoegner
 Der Schwierige Außenseiter: Erinnerungen eines Abgeordneten, Emigranten und Ministerpräsidenten (in German), by Wilhelm Hoegner, Munich, publisher: Isar Verlag, 1959

See also 
 List of Premiers of Bavaria
 Walter Kolbenhoff

References

Sources
 Universitätsbibliothek Regensburg - Boisls bayrische Biography - Wilhelm Hoegner pp. 356–357 
 Institut für Zeitgeschichte - Wilhelm Hoegner 
  Wilhelm Hoeger biography Official Bavarian government website

External links
 

1887 births
1980 deaths
Ministers-President of Bavaria
Ministers of the Bavaria State Government
Members of the Landtag of Bavaria
Social Democratic Party of Germany politicians
Politicians from Munich
People from the Kingdom of Bavaria
Grand Crosses 1st class of the Order of Merit of the Federal Republic of Germany
Knights Grand Cross of the Order of Merit of the Italian Republic
Recipients of the Grand Decoration with Sash for Services to the Republic of Austria
Exiles from Nazi Germany
Members of the Reichstag of the Weimar Republic
German anti-communists